The Great Seal of the State of Minnesota is the state seal of the U.S. state of Minnesota. Originally adopted in 1858 following Minnesota's statehood, the seal's original version is an adaptation of Minnesota's territorial seal modified by the state's first governor and fur trader, Henry Hastings Sibley. It has been modified several times by the state legislature since 1858, including in 1971 and 1983. The seal's design symbolizes many important aspects to Minnesota's history and culture; such as the growth of industry powered by Saint Anthony Falls, the state's Native American heritage, the importance of industries like lumber and agriculture, and the taming of the wilderness by the state's early pioneers. 

The seal is prominently featured on the Flag of Minnesota. In recent years, the seal and the flag have prompted backlash and controversy for its perceived depiction of Minnesota and Native Americans.  There have been several recent unsuccessful attempts in the Minnesota Legislature to change the flag as of June 2022.

Symbolism
A Native American rides on horseback in the background, symbolizing Minnesota's Native American heritage.  A sun on the western horizon is a sunset. The straight horizon line reflects the plains covering much of Minnesota. The Native American is on horseback is riding towards the south. The native's horse and spear and the pioneer's ax, rifle, and plow represent tools of daily life. The only interaction between the figures is one observing the other.  The tools used by the Native American and the farmer represent the tools used for labor and hunting while the stump symbolizes the taming of the land and the importance of the lumber industry to Minnesota in 1858. The Mississippi River and St. Anthony Falls are depicted in the revised seal to note the importance of these resources in transportation, industry and the settling of the state. The furrowing of the ground by the plow represents the submission of the land to the pioneer.  The plow also symbolizes the importance of agriculture to Minnesota and its future.  The waterfalls are not on the original State Seal. Beyond the falls on the current seal are three pine trees representing the state tree and the three pine regions of the state; the St Croix, Mississippi, and Lake Superior.

Criticism of Symbolism
As displayed on the Flag of Minnesota, the Minnesota Great Seal has been criticized as racist. It is said to depict a European settler displacing an original Native American inhabitant of Minnesota. This inferred symbolism has been called an example of an erasure of native history to promote white racial power, as it provides a false historical context for the reality of native genocide and displacement as a result of white colonization. There have been several attempts to change the seal in recent years, and discussion continues about possible replacement.

Government Seals of Minnesota

See also

Flag of Minnesota

References

Symbols of Minnesota
Minnesota
Minnesota
Minnesota
Minnesota
Minnesota
Minnesota
Minnesota
Minnesota
Minnesota
Native Americans in art